Summit Lake is a lake in Kenora District, Ontario, Canada. The lake is in the Nelson River system in the Hudson Bay drainage basin. There are no primary inflows, and the primary outflow is an unnamed creek, south towards Mud Lake, which flows into Upper Manitou Lake, and then via the Manitou River, Seine River, Rainy River, Winnipeg River and Nelson River into Hudson Bay. Highway 502 runs on the east side of the lake.

See also
List of lakes in Ontario

References

Lakes of Kenora District